John Clark House in Clarksdale, Mississippi was built in 1859 with elements of Greek Revival style. The John Clark House was then remodeled, including that its "two-tiered one-bay porch supported with turned posts was replaced with a then-stylish Colonial Revival porch."

It was listed on the National Register of Historic Places in 2003.

See also 
 National Register of Historic Places listings in Coahoma County, Mississippi
 Riverside Hotel:  Blues Trail site in Clarksdale
 Delta Blues Museum

References

Colonial Revival architecture in Mississippi
Houses completed in 1859
Houses on the National Register of Historic Places in Mississippi
Houses in Coahoma County, Mississippi
National Register of Historic Places in Coahoma County, Mississippi
Clarksdale, Mississippi